{{Speciesbox
| image = Searsia pentaphylla kz04.jpg
| image_caption = Searsia pentaphylla in Tanant (Béni Mellal-Khénifra, Morocco)
| status = LC
| status_system = IUCN3.1
| status_ref = 
| genus = Searsia
| species = pentaphylla
| authority =  (Jacq.) F.A.Barkley ex Moffett
| synonyms = 
 Rhus pentaphylla (Jacq.) Desf.
 Toxicodendron pentaphyllum (Jacq.) Kuntze
 Rhamnus pentaphylla Jacq.
|synonyms_ref = <ref name = powo>Searsia pentaphylla (Jacq.) F.A.Barkley ex Moffett Plants of the World Online, Kew Science. Accessed 9 October 2022.</ref>
}}Searsia pentaphylla, the tizra tree, is a sumac shrub or small tree species in the genus Searsia found in  North Africa, especially in Morocco and Algeria, the Levant, and Sicily.

DescriptionSearsia pentaphylla is typically a thorny shrub or small tree. It is frost resistant.

Range and habitatSearsia pentaphylla'' is native to northwestern Africa, including Algeria, Morocco, Tunisia, and Western Sahara, and to Sicily, Israel, and Palestine. In Sicily it is found between Sampieri and Cava d'Aliga.

Its typical habitat is coastal shrubland in regions with a Mediterranean climate.

Conservation and threats
The shrub is locally abundant in northwestern Africa, and its subpopulations there are considered stable. There are also multiple populations in coastal Israel and Palestine. The conservation status of the species is assessed as least concern.

The species has a limited distribution in Sicily, and is considered vulnerable there. Fewer than 1,000 mature individuals are known in Sicily. It had been found in Palermo, Sciacca, Linosa, San Vito Lo Capo, but may no longer be present there.

Uses
Its roots and heartwood are used to produce tannin of the condensed type.

References

External links

pentaphylla
Plants described in 1798
Flora of the Mediterranean Basin
Flora of North Africa
Flora of Israel
Flora of Palestine (region)
Flora of Sicily